Taura Air Base  is a military airport  east of Guayaquil in Guayas Province, Ecuador. The base is on the west bank of the Taura River.

See also

 List of airports in Ecuador
 Transport in Ecuador

References

External links
 HERE Maps - Taura
 OpenStreetMap - Taura Air Base
 OurAirports - Taura
 Taura

Airports in Ecuador